Hunting Grounds (formerly known as "Howl" after the Allen Ginsberg poem of the same name) are a six piece Australian punk band. They formed at Ballarat High School and won Triple J's Unearthed High competition with their song "Blackout" which was placed on high rotation by the station. 

In 2010 Hunting Grounds supported fellow Ballarat act Yacht Club DJs on their Batten Down the Hatches Australian Tour. The tour was sold out and the two bands fronted two encore shows at St Kilda's Prince of Wales Bandroom.

Discography

Album
In Hindsight (2012)

EPs
Howl (2009) 
Brothers In Violence (2010)

References

Victoria (Australia) musical groups
Australian punk rock groups